Acrocercops marmaritis is a moth of the family Gracillariidae, known from Mexico. It was described by Thomas de Grey, 6th Baron Walsingham, in 1914.

References

marmaritis
Moths of Central America
Moths described in 1914